Cheng Tsung-che (born July 26, 2001) is a Taiwanese baseball infielder in the Pittsburgh Pirates organization.

Professional career
Cheng, a native of Pingtung County, Taiwan, signed with the Pittsburgh Pirates out of Pu-Men High School as an international free agent on July 2, 2019, for a signing bonus of $380,000.

Cheng made his professional debut with the Florida Complex League Pirates in 2021, and played second base, third base, and shortstop throughout the season. After the 2021 minor league season ended, Cheng played winter ball with the Caimanes de Barranquilla, winning the 2022 Caribbean Series.

Cheng spent the 2022 Minor League Baseball season with the Bradenton Marauders, playing shortstop more frequently. He appeared in 104 games, hit for a .270 batting average, .376 on-base percentage, and a .794 on-base plus slugging percentage, while scoring 79 runs. Of his 38 extra-base hits, seven were triples. He led the Florida State League in triples and runs scored, finished second in on-base percentage, fourth in batting average, and fifth in on-base plus slugging percentage. Cheng's 33 stolen bases in 39 attempts led all minor leaguers within the Pirates organization. At the end of the 2022 minor league season, Cheng was assigned to the Gigantes de Carolina of the Puerto Rican Professional Baseball League.

International career
Shortly after signing with the Pittsburgh Pirates, Cheng competed in the 2019 U-18 Baseball World Cup. Cheng was named to the Chinese Taipei national baseball team roster for the 2023 World Baseball Classic. Over the course of the tournament, he drove in three runs.

References

External links

2001 births
Living people
Bradenton Marauders players
People from Pingtung County
Gigantes de Carolina players
Taiwanese expatriate baseball players in the United States
Liga de Béisbol Profesional Roberto Clemente infielders
Florida Complex League Pirates players
2023 World Baseball Classic players